Roy Gulch is a valley in San Mateo County, California, containing a small stream that is a tributary of Pescadero Creek.

References

See also
List of watercourses in the San Francisco Bay Area

Valleys of San Mateo County, California
Landforms of the San Francisco Bay Area
Valleys of California
Tributaries of Pescadero Creek